A meroterpene (or merterpenoid) is a chemical compound having a partial terpenoid structure.

Examples

Terpenophenolics 
Terpenophenolics are compounds that are part terpenes, part natural phenols. Plants in the genus Humulus and Cannabis produce terpenophenolic metabolites. Examples of terpenophenolics are:
 Bakuchiol
 Ferruginol
 Mutisianthol
 Totarol
Terpenophenolics can also be isolated from animals. The terpenophenolics methoxyconidiol, epiconicol and didehydroconicol, isolated from the ascidian Aplidium aff. densum, show antiproliferative activity.

References